The Royal Swordsmen is a Chinese wuxia television series directed by Deng Yancheng and Wei Liyuan, starring Roger Kwok, Li Yapeng, Wallace Huo, Michelle Ye, Damian Lau, Tammy Chen, Gao Yuanyuan and Eva Huang. It was first shown on Shenzhen Media Group's Drama Channel on 30 January 2005.

Plot
The series is set in China during the Ming dynasty. Zhu Wushi, the Emperor's uncle, had received an order from the previous emperor to establish a secret service to protect the monarchy. One of the most formidable martial artists in the jianghu himself, Zhu Wushi has recruited four elite agents who are known by their code names: Heaven Number One, Mysterious Number One, Earth Number One, and Yellow Number One.

Heaven Number One is the calm and cool-headed Duan Tianya, who was raised as Zhu Wushi's godson and sent to Japan to learn ninjutsu from the Iga School. While in Japan, he had a romantic relationship with Yukihime, the elder daughter of Yagyū Tajima-no-Kami, the patriarch of the influential Yagyū clan. He also meets Nemuri Kyōshirō and learns kenjutsu from him. However, he becomes an enemy of the Yagyū clan after taking revenge against Yukihime's brother, who had murdered Nemuri Kyōshirō. Torn between her family and her lover, Yukihime ultimately sacrificed herself to prevent her father from killing Duan Tianya in a duel. Years later, Duan Tianya encounters Yukihime's sister and starts a relationship with her, but this brings him into conflict with the Yagyū clan again.

Mysterious Number One is the beautiful and intelligent Shangguan Haitang, who is well-versed in various skills and arts, including medicine and astronomy. Like Duan Tianya, she was also raised by Zhu Wushi as his goddaughter and trained by him in martial arts. She is in charge of an organisation made up of experts who are considered "Number Ones" in their respective trades, fields and professions. Through the organisation, she helps her godfather gather intelligence and scout for talents to join the secret service.

Earth Number One is the cold and aloof Guihai Yidao, whose skill in using the dao is unparalleled. He desires to avenge his murdered father and sees it as his purpose in life. In his quest for vengeance, he masters a powerful but highly perverse skill, and finds himself falling under its evil influence — to the point where he loses control of himself and starts to indiscriminately kill anyone who tries to stop him. He has also been secretly in love with Shangguan Haitang for many years but does not have the courage to confess his feelings to her.

Yellow Number One is the streetwise Cheng Shifei, who used to be a gambler, thief and confidence trickster. By coincidence, he encounters a dying Gu Santong, Zhu Wushi's love rival, who had lost to Zhu Wushi in a duel and has been imprisoned for many years. Before his death, Gu Santong transfers to Cheng Shifei all his inner energy and knowledge about martial arts, including a skill that allows him to temporarily turn his body into impenetrable metal, in the hope that Cheng Shifei can help him fulfil his wish of defeating Zhu Wushi. Cheng Shifei also incidentally meets the Emperor's sister, Princess Yunluo, and starts a romance with her and marries her eventually.

The secret service is in an ongoing political rivalry with the Eastern Depot, another imperial spy agency led by the eunuch Cao Zhengchun. The Emperor knows that Zhu Wushi and Cao Zhengchun are equally influential in politics, so he has been pitting them against each other in order to prevent either side from gaining too much power. The four agents help Zhu Wushi counter Cao Zhengchun's machinations on one hand, and perform their duties to the monarchy by protecting the Emperor from domestic and foreign threats on the other hand.

Zhu Wushi ultimately overcomes and eliminates Cao Zhengchun and becomes the single, most influential figure in the imperial court. At this point, he finally reveals his true colours. All these years, he has been secretly plotting an elaborate scheme to usurp the throne from the Emperor and he is now in the best position to do so; the four agents are merely pawns in his quest for power. In the end, the three surviving agents combine forces to defeat their treacherous master and save the Emperor.

Cast
 Roger Kwok as Cheng Shifei
 Li Yapeng as Duan Tianya / Takizawa Ichirō (Longze Yilang)
 Wallace Huo as Guihai Yidao
 Michelle Ye as Shangguan Haitang
 Gui Yun as Shangguan Haitang (child)
 Damian Lau as Zhu Wushi ("Tiedan Shenhou")
 Tammy Chen as Princess Yunluo
 Gao Yuanyuan as Yagyū Hyōjo (Liusheng Piaoxu)
 Liu Sisi as Yagyū Hyōjo (child)
 Eva Huang as Yagyū Yukihime (Liusheng Xueji)
 Kurata Yasuaki as Yagyū Tajima-no-Kami (Liusheng Danmashou)
 Zhang Yapeng as Yagyū Jūbei (Liusheng Shibingwei)
 Dicky Cheung as Gu Santong
 Deng Chao as the Emperor
 Monica Chan as Suxin
 Kent Tong as Wan Sanqian
 Adam Chen as Kobayashi Masa (Xiaolin Zheng) / Lin Xiaoquan
 Li Jianyi as Cao Zhengchun
 Lynn Poh as Xiaonu
 Zuki Lee as Princess Lixiu
 Tang Qun as the Empress Dowager
 Tan Jianchang as Zhang Jinjiu
 Lu Yong as Wuwan
 Hu Ronghua as Zhang Laosan
 Chen Fu as Li Tianhao
 Yang Shu as Li Zhengkai
 Zhang Lei as Guihai Bailian
 Tong Tong as Lu Huanong
 Niu Guanzhong as Tiezhao Feiying
 Yao Jianming as Eunuch Sun
 Ye Qing as Cheng Huan

Production
Shooting for The Royal Swordsmen started on 22 March 2004 in Wuxi, and wrapped up on 21 June in the same year.

Broadcasts
The series was first aired in mainland China on Shenzhen Media Group's Drama Channel on 30 January 2005. It started airing on 14 February 2005 on CTS Main Channel in Taiwan, and on 25 October 2006 on TVB in Hong Kong.

References

External links
  The Royal Swordsmen official page on TVB's website
  ''The Royal Swordsmen' on Sina.com

TVB dramas
Chinese wuxia television series
Taiwanese wuxia television series
Hong Kong wuxia television series
Television series set in the Ming dynasty
2005 Chinese television series debuts
2005 Taiwanese television series debuts
2005 Hong Kong television series debuts
Mandarin-language television shows